The Raccordo autostradale 2 (RA 2), or Raccordo autostradale di Avellino, literally "Motorway connection to Avellino", is an Italian motorway that connects the city of Avellino with the motorways A2 and A30 at the Fisciano junction.  It is a part of the European route E841.

History 
The road, originally connecting Salerno to Avellino, was built by the state road company ANAS to connect the city of Avellino to the national motorway network at Salerno; in 1967 it was technically classified as a motorway, with the official denomination "Raccordo autostradale Salerno-Avellino" (literally: "Motorway connection Salerno–Avellino").

In 2001 the road got the official number RA 02, actually not commonly used.

In 2017 the section between Salerno and Fisciano was classified as a part of the new A2 motorway; after that the shorter RA 2 is called "Raccordo autostradale di Avellino" (literally: "Motorway connection to Avellino").

See also 
 Autostrade of Italy

References

External links 

 ANAS SpA 

RA02
Transport in Campania